Iago ab Idwal ap Meurig (died 1039) was a Prince of Gwynedd and Powys. He was also referred to as "King of the Britons" in the Annals of Ulster.

On the death of Llywelyn ap Seisyll in 1023, the rule of Gwynedd returned to the ancient dynasty with the accession of Iago, who was a great-grandson of Idwal Foel.

Very little is known about the reign of Iago. He was killed by his own men in 1039 and replaced by Llywelyn ap Seisyll's son, Gruffydd ap Llywelyn. Iago's grandson Gruffudd ap Cynan later won the throne of Gwynedd, and because his father, Cynan ab Iago, was little known in Wales, Gruffudd was styled "grandson of Iago" rather than the usual "son of Cynan".

References

1039 deaths
Monarchs of Gwynedd
11th-century Welsh monarchs
Year of birth unknown
Welsh princes
House of Aberffraw